This is a list of  Time Team  episodes from series 17. The series was released on DVD (region 2) in 2013.

Episode

Series 17

Episode # refers to the air date order. The Time Team Specials are aired in between regular episodes, but are omitted from this list. Regular contributors on Time Team include: Tony Robinson (presenter); archaeologists Mick Aston, Phil Harding, Helen Geake; Guy de la Bedoyere (historian); Victor Ambrus (illustrator); Stewart Ainsworth (landscape investigator); John Gater (geophysicist); Henry Chapman (surveyor).

Notes

References

External links
Channel 4 Time Team episode features including dig-reports and summaries by the archaeologists.
Time Team at Channel4.com
The Unofficial Time Team site Fan site

Time Team (Series 17)
2010 British television seasons